Floyd County is a county located in the Commonwealth of Virginia. As of the 2020 census, the population was 15,476. Its county seat is the town of Floyd. Floyd County is included in the Blacksburg-Christiansburg, VA Metropolitan Statistical Area. Named after Virginia politician John Floyd,  the county was established in 1831. 
The county is located on the high plateau of the Blue Ridge Mountains and surrounded by the Little River. In the 1960s and 1970s, Floyd proved popular with people in the era's counterculture, particularly those who wanted to live in closer contact with nature.

History 

Floyd County's recorded history begins with the arrival of traders, trappers and hunters in Southwest Virginia in the 18th century. The earliest known travel way through present day Floyd County was the Trader's Path, running from east to west across the Roanoke River where Back Creek enters the river, by John Mason's, R. Poage's, the headwaters of Back Creek and southwest over Bent Mountain. The trail continued westward through the Little River area to the Lead Mines.

The first known attempts to settle the area appear to have been made during the 1740s. In 1745 the Virginia Council granted James Patton, of Augusta County, among others,  on the New River and the westward flowing waters, including the Little River area. In 1749 the Royal Company of Virginia also received a grant on the westward flowing waters, putting the two companies in competition with one another to settle the area. The first surveying of the land occurred in the late 1740s.

On January 15, 1831, the General Assembly of Virginia passed an act creating the present county of Floyd out of the county Montgomery. The new county was named for the then Governor of Virginia, John Floyd. The new county's courthouse was completed in 1834. In 1870 a portion of Franklin County was added to Floyd County. The first Commonwealth's Attorney was William Ballard Preston, a nephew of John Floyd, who would later serve as Secretary of the United States Navy.  Preston was followed in later years by Jubal Early, who would later serve as a general for the Confederate Army.

The county seat of Floyd County was first called Jacksonville for Andrew Jackson, seventh President of the United States (1829–1837). Jacksonville was first incorporated in 1858 and then re-incorporated on February 19, 1892, to expand the town boundaries. On January 23, 1896, the General Assembly passed an Act officially changing the name of the Town of Jacksonville to the town of Floyd.

The county became a destination for those involved in the counterculture during the 1960s and 1970s, particularly those who wanted to live in closer contact with nature.  In the late 1990s, the Rivendell community was established by a group of Christians so they could practice a lifestyle consistent with their Reformed Churches' interpretations of the Bible and also, in part, to be better isolated from possible societal disruptions caused by the year 2000 problem. Most of the original members of this community have moved on.

Floyd County was also a setting for the ministry of Reverend Bob Childress, whose life was chronicled in the book The Man Who Moved a Mountain.

The county's location directly adjacent to both the Roanoke and the Blacksburg-Christiansburg Metropolitan Statistical Areas have contributed to modest population growth in contrast to most rural counties in Southwest Virginia.  Several bloggers live in the county and frequently post observations about the community and its rural setting.

Floyd County also has a strong music and literary scene.  Three establishments in Floyd regularly offer a variety of live music during the weekends ranging from traditional styles such as Bluegrass and Old-time music to contemporary and alternative acts.  Best known is the Friday Night Jamboree held at The Floyd Country Store.  Both the Floyd Country Store and County Sales, founded in the 1960s, are featured on the Virginia Heritage Music Trail called "The Crooked Road." In the early 21st century, Floyd became the home of an annual world music festival called FloydFest. Floyd County-based old time string band The Alum Ridge Boys & Ashlee won first prize at the 85th Annual Old Fiddlers' Convention held in Galax, Virginia.

The Chateau Morrisette and Villa Appalaccia wineries have been established since the 1980s.

Geography

It is located in the Blue Ridge Mountains of southwestern Virginia.

Floyd County is situated atop a high plateau of the Blue Ridge Mountains which divides the eastward flowing from the westward flowing waters. With the high topography, no streams flow into Floyd County. The county is drained primarily by Little River and its tributaries which flow into New River below the Claytor Lake Dam and, in turn, by way of the Kanawha River, the Ohio River and the Mississippi River, into the Gulf of Mexico.

The Little River, the county’s largest waterway, is formed by three main branches, or forks: the East, West, and South (also known as Dodd’s Creek). It is said that no water flows into Floyd County.

The headwaters of the south fork of the Roanoke River are in the northeastern part of the county. One particular fast stream is Shooting Creek, named for its speed over rocks. This creek today follows Shooting Creek Road from Floyd into Franklin County. In was once the site of moonshine liquor  distilleries and the lawlessness that surrounded this industry.

Adjacent counties
 Franklin County, Virginia – east
 Patrick County, Virginia – southeast
 Carroll County, Virginia – southwest
 Pulaski County, Virginia – northwest
 Montgomery County, Virginia – northwest
 Roanoke County, Virginia – north

National protected area
 Blue Ridge Parkway (part), including Rocky Knob Recreation Area (part)
 Buffalo Mountain Natural Area Preserve

Major highways

Demographics

2020 census

Note: the US Census treats Hispanic/Latino as an ethnic category. This table excludes Latinos from the racial categories and assigns them to a separate category. Hispanics/Latinos can be of any race.

2000 Census
As of the census of 2000, there were 13,874 people, 5,791 households, and 4,157 families residing in the county.  The population density was 36 people per square mile (14/km2).  There were 6,763 housing units at an average density of 18 per square mile (7/km2).  The racial makeup of the county was 96.71% White, 2.00% Black or African American, 0.09% Native American, 0.09% Asian, 0.01% Pacific Islander, 0.36% from other races, and 0.74% from two or more races.  1.35% of the population were Hispanic or Latino of any race.

There were 5,791 households, out of which 29.10% had children under the age of 18 living with them, 59.90% were married couples living together, 8.10% had a female householder with no husband present, and 28.20% were non-families. 24.70% of all households were made up of individuals, and 10.80% had someone living alone who was 65 years of age or older.  The average household size was 2.39 and the average family size was 2.83.

In the county, the population was spread out, with 22.20% under the age of 18, 6.90% from 18 to 24, 27.60% from 25 to 44, 27.40% from 45 to 64, and 15.90% who were 65 years of age or older.  The median age was 40 years. For every 100 females there were 97.50 males.  For every 100 females age 18 and over, there were 96.70 males.

The median income for a household in the county was $31,585, and the median income for a family was $38,128. Males had a median income of $30,886 versus $20,466 for females. The per capita income for the county was $16,345.  About 8.50% of families and 11.70% of the population were below the poverty line, including 12.70% of those under age 18 and 15.30% of those age 65 or over.

Communities
Town of Floyd

Other communities:

Government and politics
Floyd County is an anomaly in Virginia politics, being a solidly Republican county even during the height of the Democratic "Solid South". This is due to the fact that the county's inhabitants largely deserted the Confederate army during the Civil War, so that it was one of very few white areas in antebellum slave states to endorse Radical Reconstruction. Over generations, this has translated into powerful party loyalty thereto. Floyd was the only Virginia county to vote for Herbert Hoover against Franklin Roosevelt in 1932, and the last Democrat to carry the county in a presidential election was Winfield S. Hancock in 1880. Theodore Roosevelt did win Floyd County in 1912 as a result of a split in the Republican Party, while Democratic Senatorial candidate Mark Warner carried the county in his landslide 2008 victory.

Board of Supervisors
 District A (Locust Grove District): Levi Cox (R)
 District B (Little River District): Linda DeVito Kuchenbuch (I)
 District C (Courthouse District): Jerry W. Boothe (D)
 District D (Burks Fork District): Joe D. Turman (R)
 District E (Indian Valley District): Kalinda Bechtold (R)

Constitutional officers
 Clerk of the Circuit Court: Rhonda T. Vaughn (R)
 Commissioner of the Revenue: Lisa Dawn Baker (R)
 Commonwealth's Attorney: Eric Branscom
 Sheriff: Brian Craig (R)
 Treasurer: Melissa M. "Missy" Keith (R)

Floyd is represented by Republican David R. Sutterlein in the Virginia Senate, Republican Marie March in the Virginia House of Delegates, and Republican H. Morgan Griffith in the U.S. House of Representatives.

See also
 National Register of Historic Places in Floyd County, Virginia

References

External links
 County Government Page
 Floyd Virginia Online
 Floyd County Chamber of Commerce

 
Virginia counties
1831 establishments in Virginia
Populated places established in 1831
Counties of Appalachia